Miguel Angel Portugal Vicario (born 28 November 1955) is a Spanish retired footballer who played as a midfielder, and is a current manager.

He totalled 66 games and four goals in La Liga for four clubs including Real Madrid, for whom he played a part in their league and Copa del Rey double in 1979–80.

In a managerial career lasting a quarter of a century, Portugal had two spells at Racing Santander in the top flight. From the 2010s, he had brief stints abroad in Bolivia, Brazil, Algeria and India, winning a league title for Club Bolívar in 2013.

Playing career
Portugal was born in Quintanilla de las Viñas, Province of Burgos. During his career he played for Burgos CF, CD Mirandés, Real Madrid, Cádiz CF, Rayo Vallecano, CD Castellón, Real Burgos CF, Real Valladolid and Córdoba CF.

With the La Liga powerhouse, Portugal remained four years (one loaned at Cádiz), winning the double in his first year but only amassing a combined 27 top division appearances during his spell.

Coaching career

Early career
Portugal started managing in the mid-90s, returning to Real Madrid to be in charge of its C and B-sides. In 1999, he started in the second division with CD Toledo, but was fired after only a couple of months.

After some years out of football, Portugal coached former club Córdoba also in the second level, returning to Real Madrid Castilla in 2005–06 following the December promotion to the first team of Juan Ramón López Caro. On 6 July 2006 he succeeded López Caro once again, now at Racing de Santander, helping the Cantabrians to a final tenth place in the top flight.

Portugal served as technical director of Real Madrid subsequently. In November 2008, he was set to take over at the club as coach following the sacking of Bernd Schuster, but president Ramón Calderón preferred Juande Ramos instead.

On 19 November 2009, Portugal returned to Racing on a two-year deal following the dismissal of Juan Carlos Mandiá, as the side had only collected one point in five home matches. In early February 2011, even though the team was placed above the relegation zone in the top division – eventually managing to stay afloat – he was sacked by new club owner, Ahsan Ali Syed from India.

Abroad
In June 2012, Portugal moved abroad for the first time when he was appointed at Club Bolívar in Bolivia. In his debut season, the team from La Paz won the Clausura of the Bolivian Primera División; he was sacked at the turn of 2014, after the club lost the Apertura honour to rivals The Strongest on the final day of the campaign.

Portugal remained in South America, signing days later for Clube Atlético Paranaense in Brazil on a year-long contract. He resigned on 19 May.

On 21 October 2015, Portugal returned to Spain and its second division with Real Valladolid, inheriting a team from Gaizka Garitano that was in the relegation zone. He was dismissed the following 24 April after a run of one point from five games, though the side's position had improved.

Portugal was hired by CS Constantine of Algeria on a one-year deal in November 2016. He quit the following month, having made previous threats to leave his job.

On 17 July 2017, Portugal moved to the fourth continent of his career when he was hired at Delhi Dynamos FC of the Indian Super League. He finished eighth of ten teams – blaming this on a sporadic match schedule and low transfer budget– and the following 1 May he returned to Spain after being appointed manager of Granada CF.

In August 2018, Portugal was announced as the head coach of FC Pune City for the upcoming season. He was sacked on 24 October, after one draw and two losses.

On 20 December 2018, Portugal returned to Bolivia to take over at C.D. Jorge Wilstermann on a one-year deal. He left the following April by mutual consent, having suffered threats from some of the Cochabamba-based club's supporters.

Remaining in the Andean country, Portugal was appointed on a one-year contract at Royal Pari F.C. at the start of 2020. He resigned on 21 May that year, due to concerns over the resumption of the season around the COVID-19 pandemic.

On 3 August 2021, Portugal returned to Bolivia and Royal Pari, replacing sacked Christian Díaz. He was dismissed the following 28 February, after opening the new season with two wins and two draws.

Managerial statistics

Honours

Player
Real Madrid
La Liga: 1979–80
Copa del Rey: 1979–80

Manager
Bolívar
Bolivian Primera División: 2012–13

References

External links

1955 births
Living people
Sportspeople from the Province of Burgos
Spanish footballers
Footballers from Castile and León
Association football midfielders
La Liga players
Segunda División players
Segunda División B players
Burgos CF (1936) footballers
CD Mirandés footballers
Real Madrid CF players
Cádiz CF players
Rayo Vallecano players
CD Castellón footballers
Real Burgos CF footballers
Real Valladolid players
Córdoba CF players
Spain under-23 international footballers
Spain amateur international footballers
Spanish football managers
La Liga managers
Segunda División managers
Segunda División B managers
Real Madrid C managers
Real Madrid Castilla managers
CD Toledo managers
Córdoba CF managers
Racing de Santander managers
Real Valladolid managers
Granada CF managers
Club Bolívar managers
Royal Pari F.C. managers
Campeonato Brasileiro Série A managers
Club Athletico Paranaense managers
CS Constantine managers
Indian Super League head coaches
Spanish expatriate football managers
Expatriate football managers in Bolivia
Expatriate football managers in Brazil
Expatriate football managers in Algeria
Expatriate football managers in India
Spanish expatriate sportspeople in Bolivia
Spanish expatriate sportspeople in Brazil
Spanish expatriate sportspeople in Algeria
Spanish expatriate sportspeople in India
Real Madrid CF non-playing staff